Dominique Klinnik (born 11 February 1965) is a French bobsledder. He competed in the four man event at the 1992 Winter Olympics.

References

1965 births
Living people
French male bobsledders
Olympic bobsledders of France
Bobsledders at the 1992 Winter Olympics
Place of birth missing (living people)